Taupin is the debut studio album by longtime Elton John lyricist Bernie Taupin. (released eponymously in the U.S.). It is a spoken word album of his poetry with music that revolves around the them. The album was produced by Gus Dudgeon and coordinated by Steve Brown.

Track listing
All songs written by Bernie Taupin, Caleb Quaye, and Davey Johnstone, except where noted.

Side one
 "Child"
 "Birth"
 "The Greatest Discovery" (Elton John, Taupin)
 "Flatters (a beginning)"
 "Brothers Together"
 "Rowston Manor"
 "End of a Day"
 "To a Grandfather" (Taupin, Quaye, Johnstone, Shawn Phillips)
 "Solitude"
 "Conclusion"

Side two
 "When the Heron Wakes"
 "Like Summer Tempests"
 "Today's Hero"  (Taupin, Quaye, Johnstone, Phillips)
 "Sisters of the Cross"  (Taupin, Richard Coff, Diana Lewis)
 "Brothers Together Again"
 "Verses After Dark"
 "La Petite Marionette" (Taupin, Coff)
 "Ratcatcher"  (Taupin, Phillips)
 "The Visitor" (Taupin, Phillips)

Personnel
 Bernie Taupin - spoken word
 Ron Chesterman - double bass
 Richard Coff - violin, viola
 Diana Lewis - piano
 Shawn Phillips - sitar, electric guitar, 6- and 12-string acoustic guitars, koto, spoken word
 Caleb Quaye - piano, organ, acoustic guitar
 Davey Johnstone - sitar, acoustic guitar, banjo, mandolin, lute
 Chris Karan - tabla, finger cymbals

References 

 Taupin at Allmusic

External links 
 

1971 debut albums
Albums produced by Gus Dudgeon
Spoken word albums by English artists
DJM Records albums